Villarroya de los Pinares is a municipality located in the Maestrazgo region, province of Teruel, Aragon, Spain. According to the 2004 census (INE), the municipality had a population of 190 inhabitants.

It is in the northern part of the Gúdar mountain range next to the Guadalope River at an altitude of 1,337 meters and at a distance of 51 km from the provincial capital, Teruel on the A-226 road.

Local Policy 
Last mayors of Villarroya de los Pinares

Demography 
Like many other municipalities in the province of Teruel and the province as a whole, Villarroya de los Pinares has a low population density (close to 3 inhabitants / km²). For decades, the municipality has experienced a gradual depopulation of its territory, in parallel to the aging of its inhabitants, as has happened in so many other places of mainly agricultural and livestock vocation, located in the plateaus and mountain ranges of inland Spain.

Economy 
Traditionally, its source of livelihood is agriculture and livestock. More recently, rural tourism has begun to become one more reason to visit the municipality. Nearby are the ski slopes of the Sierra de Gúdar. The abundant hunting and fishing are additional attractions.

Buildings 

The municipality of Villarroya de los Pinares was declared a Historic-artistic Site in 1982. Many historic buildings in the urban area are crowned with ancient shields and inscriptions.

The municipality's Gothic church, built-in 1459 and dedicated to the Virgen de la Asunción, has a remarkable polygonal apse and a porticoed gallery. It has undergone several repairs since then. Cardinal Francisco Peña, who always harbored the dream of transforming it into a cathedral, lies buried in it.  

The hermitage built in honor of the patron saint of the place, San Benón, stands in the vicinity of the municipality. Also, in the vicinity of this, is the castle in ruins that belonged to James I of Aragón, King of Aragon, Count of Barcelona, and Lord of Montpellier.

Festivals 
Two patron saint festivals are celebrated in the village, one on 16 June in honor of San Benón, and the other on 25 July in honor of St. James the Apostle.

Illustrious personages 
 Cardinal Francisco Peña, the illustrious son of the municipality, inhabited a house of architectural interest, located in the municipality of Villarroya de los Pinares, which was built at the end of the sixteenth century and the beginning of the XVII and where they find several noble buildings.
 Cmdte. Don Narciso Alegre, who was a Carlist contemporaneous with Ramón Cabrera, 1st Duke of Maestrazgo, was another Villarroya de los Pinares resident.
 Narciso Alegre y Pellicer, son of Narciso Alegre and Juana Pellicer, who was exiled to the Philippines with his younger brother, Francisco, after the third Carlist War.
 The luthier Telesforo Julve, based in Valencia.

Images

See also
Maestrazgo, Aragon
List of municipalities in Teruel

References

Municipalities in the Province of Teruel